"Can't Stop Dancin" is a song by American singer Becky G. An accompanying music video was released onto Gomez's official Vevo account on December 3, 2014. A remix featuring Colombian singer J Balvin was released on March 3, 2015.

Background and release
"Can't Stop Dancin'" was released for retail via digital distribution, on November 4, 2014. The lyric video for the song was also uploaded to YouTube and VEVO, on the same day of its release, with cameo appearance by American singer Katy Perry.

Composition
"Can't Stop Dancin'" is written in the key of G minor and rides a moderate half-time groove of 100 beats per minute. While the melody follows the sequence Gm - E♭ - B♭ as its chord progression, Gomez's vocals span from the low tone of F3 to the high tone of B♭4.

Music video
The video was released on December 2, 2014 via VEVO, being uploaded to YouTube the following day.

The visual sees Gomez arriving at a club with her friends and later doing a choreographed dance with two male dancers. These scenes are spliced with shots of her outside of several places, such as a house and some stairs. Gomez also performs the song in front of a light-cyan wall as well as inside a room with a bed, a chair, and a TV.

The video has over 200 million views as of May 2022.

Commercial performance
"Can't Stop Dancin'" debuted at number 98 on the US Billboard Hot 100 chart and number 40 on the Billboard Pop Songs on the week dated for January 10, 2015. The song dropped out of the Billboard Hot 100 chart the next week. On the chart week dated for February 7, 2015, the song re-entered at number 95 and then peaked at number 88, becoming its succeeding week.

Track listing

Charts

Certifications

References

2014 singles
Song recordings produced by Cirkut (record producer)
Song recordings produced by Dr. Luke
Songs written by Cirkut (record producer)
Songs written by Dr. Luke
Songs written by Theron Thomas
Music videos directed by Hannah Lux Davis
Becky G songs
Songs written by Becky G
Songs about dancing